Edward Rushworth may refer to:

 Edward Rushworth (colonial administrator) (1818–1877), British colonial administrator
 Edward Rushworth (politician) (1755–1817), British politician